Albino Cossa or Bino (born 21 April 1982) is a Mozambican former professional footballer who played as a goalkeeper.

He represented Mozambique at the 2009 COSAFA Cup, and at the 2010 Africa Cup of Nations.

References

1982 births
Living people
Association football goalkeepers
Mozambican footballers
Mozambique international footballers
1998 African Cup of Nations players
2010 Africa Cup of Nations players
Sportspeople from Maputo
CD Costa do Sol players
Liga Desportiva de Maputo players